Branford is a town in Suwannee County, Florida, United States.  The population was 712 at the 2010 census.

Geography

Branford is located at  (29.961803, –82.927204).

The town is located on the banks of the Suwannee River.  U.S. Route 27 and U.S. Highway 129 intersect in Branford.

Demographics

As of the census of 2010, there were 712 people, 277 households, and 185 families in the town. The racial makeup of the town was 80.2% White, 6.9% African American, 0.8% Native American, 1.7% Asian, Hispanic or Latino of any race were 13.2% of the population.

Of the 277 households 35.7% had children under the age of 18 living with them, 40.4% were married couples living together, 20.6% had a female householder with no husband present, and 33.2% were non-families. 27.8% of households were one person and 14.8% were one person aged 65 or older.  The average household size was 2.57 and the average family size was 3.06.

The age distribution was 30.8% under the age of 19, 6.6% from 20 to 24, 27.5% from 25 to 44, 21.5% from 45 to 64, and 13.7% 65 or older.  The median age was 32.9 years.

The median household income was $32,679 and the median family income  was $36,625.  The per capita income for the town was $17,353.  About 24.9% of families and 29.2% of the population were below the poverty line, including 29.4% of those under age 18 and 12.6% of those age 65 or over.

Branford is served by two Public Schools, Branford Elementary School and Branford High School.

A public library is open 6 days per week on Suwannee Avenue.

Branford Springs
On the Suwannee River, Branford Springs within the town is a popular diving spot.

See also
Troy Spring State Park

References

External links
 Town of Branford

Towns in Suwannee County, Florida
Towns in Florida